Jayne Barnetson (born 21 January 1968) is a Scottish former athlete who competed mainly in the High jump. She finished fourth at the 1986 World Junior Championships. Her 1989 Scottish records for the high jump (1.91m) and Heptathlon (5803 pts), still stand.

International competitions

References

1968 births
Living people
Scottish female high jumpers
British high jumpers
Athletes (track and field) at the 1986 Commonwealth Games
Commonwealth Games competitors for Scotland